Fracture is a 2004 New Zealand film written and directed by Larry Parr and based on the novel by Maurice Gee.  The film is set in Wellington and stars Kate Elliott, Jared Turner and John Noble.  The film was met with positive reviews and was the second highest grossing local film at the New Zealand box office in 2004 behind In My Father's Den.

Plot

A young solo mother (Elliott) loves her son and his needs are foremost, but she still has room in her heart for her very broken brother (Turner), even as her fundamentalist mother cruelly rejects her.  But when the brother is responsible for a woman's broken neck, during his burglary of her house, families are changed as crisis amplifies and at times the young mother seems to be the only adult.

Cast

Tagline
A single crack can shatter everything.

Production
The film had originally been set for a 2003 release but was delayed during production by the dissolution of director Larry Parr's production company Kahukura Productions.

References

External links
 NZFC Profile Page

NZ On Screen page

2004 films
New Zealand crime drama films
2004 crime drama films
2000s English-language films